Torresita is a genus of beetles in the family Buprestidae, the jewel beetles. The two species in the genus are native to Australia.

Species include:

 Torresita cuprifera (Kirby, 1818)
 Torresita parallela Kerremans, 1898

References

Buprestidae genera
Beetles of Australia